Philippe de Luxembourg (1445 – 2 June 1519) was a French Cardinal

Life
He was bishop of Le Mans in 1476. He was bishop of Thérouanne 1496 to 1513, and bishop of Saint-Pons in 1509, when his nephew died, and until 1512, when he resigned in favour of François-Guillaume de Castelnau de Clermont-Lodève. He was abbot at the abbey of Jumièges in 1510.

He was a judge at the 1498 divorce trial of King Louis XII and Queen Joan of France. He was papal legate to France in 1516.

Family
His father was Cardinal Thibaud de Luxembourg.

Notes

External links

1445 births
1519 deaths
French abbots
16th-century French cardinals
Cardinals created by Pope Alexander VI
Cardinal-bishops of Albano
Cardinal-bishops of Frascati
15th-century French Roman Catholic bishops
Bishops of Arras
Bishops of Le Mans
Bishops of Saint-Pons-de-Thomières
Bishops of Thérouanne